MMXII is the sixth studio album of Turkish heavy metal band Mezarkabul (also known as Pentagram). Wasteland, the first single from the album, was released before the album as a free digital content on band's official website. MMXII is the first album of Mezarkabul with their new vocalist, Gökalp Ergen.

Track listing

Personnel 
 Pentagram
 Gökalp Ergen - Vocals
 Hakan Utangaç - Guitar
 Metin Türkcan - Guitar
 Tarkan Gözübüyük - Bass guitars
 Cenk Ünnü - Drums

References 

Mezarkabul albums
2012 albums